The South High Commercial Historic District is a historic district on High Street in Downtown Columbus, Ohio. The site was listed on the National Register of Historic Places in 1983 and the Columbus Register of Historic Properties in 1987.

The district includes 11 contributing commercial buildings, spanning two city blocks. The northern block includes the Great Southern Hotel and Theatre and the Schlee-Kemmler Building, both already individually listed in the Columbus and National Registers. The southern block includes nine commercial buildings from the late 19th century, mostly 2-3 stories in height, featuring a variety of architectural details. The blocks are among the last remaining cohesive streetscapes left in downtown Columbus.

Gallery

See also
 National Register of Historic Places listings in Columbus, Ohio

References

External links
 

National Register of Historic Places in Columbus, Ohio
Historic districts on the National Register of Historic Places in Ohio
1983 establishments in Ohio
Columbus Register properties
Buildings in downtown Columbus, Ohio
Historic districts in Columbus, Ohio
High Street (Columbus, Ohio)